This is a list of electoral results for the electoral district of Mentone in Victorian state elections.

Members for Mentone

Election results

Elections in the 1980s

 After the redistribution, Mentone became a notional Labor seat. Sitting Liberal member Bill Templeton did not manage to win it back.

Elections in the 1970s

Elections in the 1960s

Elections in the 1950s

Elections in the 1940s

References

Victoria (Australia) state electoral results by district